Daphnella sinuata is a species of sea snail, a marine gastropod mollusk in the family Raphitomidae.

Description
The length of the shell attains 11 mm.

Distribution
This marine species occurs off Pacific Panama

References

External links
 

sinuata
Gastropods described in 1856